One-Eyed Monster is a 2008 sci-fi/horror comedy film directed by Adam Fields about the cast and crew of an adult film having an encounter with a different kind of monster while filming in the Northern California mountains.

Plot
On a snow-covered mountain, a bus, truck, and a few cars arrive at a remote camp area to film a porno film. The group is made up of professional porn actors Ron Jeremy and Veronica Hart, novice porn stars Rock, Angel, Wanda, and Lance, as well as the director and producer Jim, cameraman Jonah, gaffer-electrician and sound guy T.J., and makeup and script girl Laura.

After being dropped off by the school bus driver who leaves them behind, the group settles in their living quarters for the next few days to shoot. While Laura talks with Ron about his past career days, the guys, Lance, Rock and T.J. talk about T.J.'s latest suck-and-squeeze device for carnal pleasure that T.J. wants to market, while Angel and Wanda talk about their experiences on the porn sets. Radio reports begin to describe a "strange light" in the sky that has been hovering over the mountains for the last several hours as Jim gets down to directing, starting with the first scene with Ron and Veronica. During a break in filming, Jonah goes outside to get some more lights from the truck while Ron also goes out to relieve himself. Suddenly, a strange light hits Ron, who then collapses to the ground. Jonah helps him up and they go back inside to finish filming the scene. Ron is acting strangely and begins to exhibit strange behavior as he begins performing in the sex scene with Veronica, who begin screaming in pain as Jim tries to yell "cut" as Ron continues to have rough sex with her. The guys are forced to pull Ron off Veronica as he goes into convulsions and collapses. T.J., Jeff, and Jonah try to help Veronica, who begins hemorrhaging and loses consciousness. They guys look over to help Ron and see that he is dead. But they also notice that Ron's legendary 9 3/4-inch penis is gone as well.

In Angel's room, she is rehearsing her upcoming scene, when the disembodied penis attacks her. Wanda walks in on this and runs out to inform Rock, Lance and Laura who run in only to find the disembodied member gone and Angel dead, with a large and gory hole in the back of her head. While everyone runs out to tell the others, Laura has an encounter with the disembodied penis which attacks her.

Holing themselves up in the main cabin, Jonah, Jim, T.J., Lance, Rock, and Wanda try to make sense of what is going on, just when Laura walks in, acting strangely. After the guys carry Ron's dead body outside, they debate on what to do since they are stranded there and no one has any signal for their cell phones. Rock wants to make a run for the cars to try to get off the mountain, but when he runs outside, the disembodied penis appears and shoves itself through him. When Jonah and T.J. run outside in a futile attempt to save him, they are surprised by the appearance of a rugged mountain man, named Montz who brings them back inside to the main cabin.

Resting, Jonah and T.J. make the assumption that Ron's missing penis is possessed by some kind of alien force. Jeff suggests finding a way to kill it while Laura, who continues acting strangely, wants to capture it. Lance and Wanda retreat to a nearby bathroom where he tries to calm down the growing hysterical Wanda over this unbelievable turn of events. Just then, the severed penis slithers in through a crack in the bathroom window and attacks them both.

Jonah and T.J. come up with a plan to capture the lethal creature by luring it through an open window, using a pair of women's panties borrowed from Laura, to try to trap it with Jeff's suck and squeeze device. Montz volunteers to kill it after he gives them a creepy but hilarious monologue about his encounter with a similar event back in Vietnam in the 1960s where he saw his platoon getting killed by a disembodied penis that came from the body of his commanding officer. T.J. volunteers to help out and has Jonah lock him and Montz in the kitchen to make sure that if they fail that Rock's penis will not be able to get them. But while their backs are turned, the disembodied penis slithers into the kitchen and strangles Montz to death, while it shoves itself with rapid speed through T.J., killing him.

Jim panics and runs into the nearby bathroom only to find a dead and cocooned Lance and Wanda against the wall. Panicking, he runs outside to the nearby barn and tries to start a snow speeder to try to escape. But the severed penis follows him in a super-fast chase down the mountain where it knocks him off his snow speeder and then gruesomely slices him in two from the crotch to the top of the head as it burrows through the snow.

Back at the main cabin, the three survivors, Jonah, Laura, and the barely conscious Veronica, are beside themselves and wait. Jonah, after being told earlier by Montz about the location of an old radio antenna atop the nearby mountain, suggests they run to a nearby cabin that Montz told them about where there is an underground passageway to the radio shack where they can radio for help. With Veronica having regained some of her strength, they make it to the passageway, which is apparently an old mine shaft, and walk through the long tunnel and make it to the radio shack where Jonah tries to get the radio to work, only the severed penis follows them and lands on Laura. Jonah tries to swing at it with an axe, but the "thing" is much too fast and keeps evading his blows. Veronica then thinks of a way to fight it. She lies down on the floor and offers herself to the entity which shoves itself between her legs. Veronica tells Jonah and Laura to run for safety as she will keep it occupied and uses her vaginal muscles to drain it of its power. Jonah and Laura flee from the radio shack cabin and down the mountain just as Veronica makes the severed dick climax.  The penis monster explodes in a massive blast, destroying itself as well as killing Veronica and blows up the radio cabin in a massive blast covering the sky with millions of particles.

Jonah and Laura seek shelter in a nearby shack where they huddle for the night. At dawn, Laura hears sounds of rain, but Jonah tells her that the rain is "Ron". The remains of the penis monster are raining down semen on the entire area.

At dawn, when the sounds had stopped, Laura leaves the cabin and a sleeping Jonah, where she ventures outside and to a place in the snow where she seems to be distraught over the death of the one-eyed monster. Laura reveals a massive bulge in her abdomen as she is now impregnated by the penis monster which attacked her earlier and will now be the apparent breeding chamber to the one-eye monster's offspring.

Cast
Amber Benson as Laura
Jason Graham as Jonah
Charles Napier as Montz
Jeff Denton as Jim
Caleb Mayo as T.J.
Bart Fletcher as Lance
Jenny Guy as Wanda
Veronica Hart as Veronica
Johnny Lee as Rock
Carmen Hart as Angel
Frank Noel as Bus Driver
Ron Jeremy as Ron

References

External links

2008 films
American comedy horror films
American science fiction films
Films about pornography
Cultural depictions of Ron Jeremy
2000s English-language films
2000s American films